Identity code may refer to:

IC codes, used by British police forces in radio communications to specify a person's ethnicity
Base station identity code, in mobile communications
 The code transmitted by a security token